Krisztián Póti (born 28 May 1988 in Budapest) is a Hungarian football player who currently plays for Erzsébeti SMTK.

Club statistics

Updated to games played as of 17 April 2018.

References
 Player profile at HLSZ 
 

1988 births
Living people
People from Mátészalka
Hungarian footballers
Association football defenders
Tököl KSK footballers
Jászberényi SE footballers
Bőcs KSC footballers
Hajdúböszörményi TE footballers
MTK Budapest FC players
Kecskeméti TE players
Nyíregyháza Spartacus FC players
Szigetszentmiklósi TK footballers
Csákvári TK players
Soproni VSE players
Balmazújvárosi FC players
Monori SE players
Ceglédi VSE footballers
ESMTK footballers
Nemzeti Bajnokság I players
Nemzeti Bajnokság II players
Sportspeople from Szabolcs-Szatmár-Bereg County